Maiellaro is an Italian surname. Notable people with the surname include:

Matt Maiellaro (born 1966), American voice actor, filmmaker, and musician
Pietro Maiellaro (born 1963), Italian footballer and manager

Surnames of Italian origin